Ragnar Horn (10 April 1913 – 24 January 2002) was a Norwegian politician for the Christian Democratic Party.

In 1946 he became the first chairman of the Youth of the Christian People's Party, the youth wing of the Christian Democratic Party.

He served as a deputy representative to the Norwegian Parliament from Oslo during the term 1958–1961.

References

1913 births
2002 deaths
Christian Democratic Party (Norway) politicians
Deputy members of the Storting